The Perlis State Legislative Assembly is the state legislature of the Malaysian state of Perlis. It is a unicameral institution, consisting of a total of 15 lawmakers representing single-member constituencies throughout the state.

Members of the state legislature are called state assemblymen. The Assembly convenes at the Perlis State Assembly Complex in the state capital, Kangar. It has 15 seats, making it the smallest state assembly in Malaysia.

Out of the 15 seats, 14 are held by the Perikatan Nasional (PN) ruling coalition after the 2022 State Election. Within the coalition, the Pan-Malaysian Islamic Party (PAS) holds 9 seats and the Malaysian United Indigenous Party (Bersatu) holds 5 seats. The PN coalition thus commands a supermajority in the legislature.

Meanwhile, the opposition is formed by the Pakatan Harapan (PH) from People's Justice Party (PKR) which only holds 1 seat.

Current composition

Seating arrangement

Role
As the state's legislative body, the Perlis State Legislative Assembly's main function is to enact laws that apply to Perlis, known as enactments. The Speaker presides over the Assembly's proceedings, and works to maintain order during debates.

The state government's executive branch (known as the State Executive Council (EXCO), or Majlis Mesyuarat Kerajaan Negeri), including the Menteri Besar, are drawn from the Assembly. The Menteri Besar is ceremonially appointed by the Raja of Perlis on the basis that he is able to command a majority in the Assembly. The Menteri Besar then appoints members of the State EXCO drawing from members of the Assembly.

Speakers Roll of Honour

The following is the Speaker of the Perlis State Legislative Assembly Roll of Honour, since 1959:

Election pendulum

The 15th General Election witnessed 14 governmental seats and a non-governmental seat filled the Perlis State Legislative Assembly. The government side has 3 safe and 5 fairly safe seat, while the non-government side has no fairly safe or safe seat.

List of Assemblies

References

External links 
 Perlis State Government official website

 
P
Unicameral legislatures